Benjamin Hawkins (August 15, 1754June 6, 1816) was an American planter, statesman and a U.S. Indian agent He was a delegate to the Continental Congress and a United States Senator from North Carolina, having grown up among the planter elite. Appointed by George Washington in 1796 as one of three commissioners to the Creeks, in 1801 President Jefferson  named him "principal agent for Indian affairs south of the Ohio [River]", and was principal Indian agent to the Creek Indians.

Hawkins established the Creek Agency and his plantation near present-day Roberta, Georgia, in what became Crawford County. He learned the Muscogee language, and had a Creek woman, Lavinia Downs, as common-law wife, who, in the Creek's matrilineal society, provided an entry into that world. He had seven children with her, although he resisted Creek pressure to marry her until near the end of his life. He wrote extensively about the Creek and other Southeast tribes: the Choctaw, Cherokee and Chickasaw. He eventually built a large complex using African slave labor, including mills, and raised a considerable quantity of cattle and hogs.

Early life and education
Hawkins was born to Philemon Hawkins and Delia (Martin) Hawkins on August 15, 1754, the third of four sons. The family farmed and operated a plantation in what was then Granville County, North Carolina, but is now Warren County.  He attended the county schools, then at the College of New Jersey (later to become Princeton University). He was "apt at multiple languages", a linguistic competence that would later enable him to learn Indian languages. When the College (which he never completed) closed because of the approach of British troops, Hawkins was commissioned a Colonel and served for several years on George Washington's staff as his main interpreter of French.

Career
Hawkins was released from federal service late in 1777, as Washington learned to rely on Lafayette for dealing with the French.  He returned home, where he was elected to the North Carolina House of Representatives in 1778.  He served there until 1779, and again in 1784. The North Carolina General Assembly sent him to the Continental Congress as their delegate from 1781 to 1783, and again in 1787.

In 1789, Hawkins was a delegate to the Fayetteville Convention that ratified the United States Constitution.  He was elected to the first U.S. Senate, where he served from 1789 to 1795. Although the Senate did not have organized political parties at the time, Hawkins' views aligned with different groups.  Early in his Senate career, he was counted in the ranks of those senators viewed as pro-Administration, but by the third congress, he generally sided with senators of the Republican or Anti-Administration Party.

U.S. Indian agent

In 1785, Hawkins had served as a representative for the Congress in negotiations over land with the Creek Indians of the Southeast. He was generally successful, and convinced the tribe to lessen their raids for several years, although he could not conclude a formal treaty.  The Creek wanted to deal with the 'head man'. They finally signed the Treaty of New York (1790) after Hawkins convinced George Washington to become involved.

In 1786, Hawkins and fellow Indian agents Andrew Pickens and Joseph Martin concluded a treaty with the Choctaw nation at Seneca Old Town, also known as Hopewell, the plantation of Andrew Pickens, near Clemson, South Carolina. They set out the boundaries for the Choctaw lands as well as provisions for relations between the tribe and the U.S. government.

In 1789, conditions among the Creeks seemed to indicate an urgency for his return to the Creek country. Accordingly, he left Tennessee early in September for Fort Wilkinson on the Oconee River in Georgia. The next few months were spent with the Creeks. January 1, 1789, was set as the date for the assembling of the commissioners for running the Creek line in conformity to the treaties at New York and Coleraine. Hawkins had some difficulty in persuading the Creeks to agree to the running of the line, as many of the younger warriors were opposed. On February 16 Hawkins reported to Secretary of War, James McHenry that the line had been run from the Tugalo River over Currahee Mountain to the main south branch of the Oconee River. Though about sixteen families of Georgians were found on the Creek lands in the area known as Wofford's Settlement, McHenry was told "...I am happy in being able to assure you that there was no diversity of opinion among us, and that the line was closed in perfect harmony." This line became known as the Hawkins Line.

In 1796, Washington appointed Benjamin Hawkins as General Superintendent of Indian Affairs, dealing with all tribes south of the Ohio River.  As principal agent to the Creek tribe, Hawkins soon moved to present-day Crawford County in Georgia where he established his home and the Creek Agency.  He studied the language and was adopted by the Creek. He wrote extensively about them and the other southeast tribes.

Georgia
Hawkins' plans for the Indians was a "civilization plan", by which he meant adopting the European-American lifestyle, raising crops and animals on farms. He began to teach European-American agricultural practices to the Creek, and started a farm at his and Lavinia's home on the Flint River. He brought his enslaved Black workers from North Carolina, and eventually purchased others. He hired other workers to assist them in clearing several hundred acres for his plantation. They built a sawmill, gristmill, and a trading post for the agency. Hawkins expanded his operation to include more than 1,000 head of cattle and a large number of hogs, and raised "immense crops" of corn and other provisions. For years, he met with chiefs on his porch and discussed matters there. His personal hard work and open-handed generosity won him such respect that reports say that he never lost an animal to Indian raiders. He became a respected and trusted man among the community, and bore the title as “The Beloved Man of the Four Nations.” Cherokee women told Hawkins "that, of the several Indian agents who visited them, he was the first who thought it worth while to examine into the situation of the women".

He contributed to the 19 years of peace between settlers and the tribe, the longest such period during European-American settlement. When in 1806 the government built a fort at the fall line of the Ocmulgee River, to protect expanding settlements just east of modern Macon, Georgia, the government named it Fort Benjamin Hawkins in his honor.

Hawkins saw much of his work to preserve peace destroyed in 1812. A group of Creek rebels, known as Red Sticks, were working to revive traditional ways and halt encroachment by European Americans. The ensuing civil war among the Creeks coincided with the War of 1812.

During the Creek War of 1813-1814, Hawkins organized "friendly" Creek Indians under the command of chief William McIntosh to aid Georgia and Tennessee militias in their forays against the traditionalist Red Sticks. General Andrew Jackson led the defeat of the Red Sticks at the Battle of Horseshoe Bend, in present-day Alabama. Hawkins was unable to attend negotiations of the Treaty of Fort Jackson in August 1814, which required the Creeks to cede most of their territory and give up their way of life. Hawkins later organized "friendly" Creek warriors to oppose a British force on the Apalachicola River that threatened to rally the scattered Red Sticks and reignite the war on the Georgia frontier. After the British withdrew in 1815, Hawkins was organizing another force when he died of a sudden illness on June 6, 1816.

Hawkins tried more than once to resign his post and return from the Georgia frontier, but no President would accept his resignation. (Dale Cox says that President Monroe accepted his resignation, but Hawkins died before Monroe became President.) He remained Superintendent until his death. Near the end of his life, he formally married Lavinia Downs in a European-American ceremony, making their children legitimate in United States society. They already belonged to Downs' clan among the Creek, who had a matrilineal kinship system. The children gained status from their mother's clan and people, and their mother's eldest brother was usually more important in their lives than their biological father.

Benjamin Hawkins was buried at the Creek Agency near the Flint River and Roberta, Georgia. He was succeeded as Indian agent by David Mitchell, former Governor of Georgia.

Fort Hawkins was built overlooking the ancient site since designated as the Ocmulgee National Monument. Revealing 17,000 years of human habitation, it is a National Historic Landmark and has been sacred for centuries to the Creek. It has massive earthwork mounds built nearly 1,000 years ago as expressions of the religious and political world of the Mississippian culture, the ancestors to the Creek.

Hawkins and slavery
Hawkins' plantation was farmed by enslaved labor, but beyond that his unhappy record on slavery has been overlooked. He transformed the Creek Agency and Fort Hawkins into holding stations for fugitive slaves, and paid Indians $50 for every fugitive delivered there. (He expected to be reimbursed by their owners.) Captured Blacks that did not have an owner, he told the Creeks to keep; i.e., he encouraged slavery among the Creeks.

It was Hawkins who first used the term negro fort to refer to the British Post on the Apalachicola River, at that time in Spanish Florida. Hawkins started the call for its capture or destruction.

Personal life
He married Susan Lavinia Downs, who some believe was a Creek Indian woman (the Creeks wanted him to take a Creek wife), whereas other evidence indicates that she was a white woman. They had a total of six daughters: Georgia, Muscogee, Cherokee, Carolina, Virginia, and Jeffersonia, and one son, James Madison Hawkins. In 1812, thinking he was on his death bed, Hawkins remarried his wife Susan Lavinia Downs to make sure their children were legitimate in U.S. society. Jeffersonia was born after this marriage.

Hawkins was close to his nephew William Hawkins, whom he made a co-executor of his estate along with his wife; he bequeathed to William a share of his estate, reputed to be quite large. This bequest became a source of contention among his heirs, especially as he had not altered his will to include his youngest daughter Jeffersonia.

Archival material
 The Georgia Historical Society has three boxes of Hawkins material, some of which has been published.

Legacy and honors
 Hawkinsville, Georgia is named in his honor.
Hawkins County in Tennessee bears his name.
He is the namesake of the Benjamin Hawkins Boy Scout Camp near Byron, Georgia.
The archeological site of the original Fort Benjamin Hawkins is listed on the National Register of Historic Places (NRHP), and it is within the Fort Hill Historic District of Macon, Georgia, also listed on the NRHP.
Hawkins was elected a member of the American Antiquarian Society in 1813.

References

Further reading (most recent first)
Robbie Franklyn Ethridge, Creek Country: The Creek Indians and Their World, Chapel Hill: University of North Carolina Press, 2003.
Thomas Foster, editor. The Collected Works of Benjamin Hawkins, 1796-1810. 2003, University of Alabama Press, .
 Florette Henri. The Southern Indians and Benjamin Hawkins, 1796-1816. 1986, University of Oklahoma Press, .
 C. L. Grant, editor. Benjamin Hawkins: Letters, Journals and Writings. 2 volumes. 1980,  Beehive Press, volume 1: , volume 2: .

External links
 Retrieved on 2009-03-04
 "Benjamin Hawkins" , New Georgia Encyclopedia
 "Benjamin Hawkins", History and Culture, Ocmulgee National Monument, National Park Service
 "Benjamin Hawkins", Horseshoe Bend National Military Park
 "Camp Benjamin Hawkins", Boy Scouts of America
 Creek Agency Old Agency historical marker, Roberta, Georgia
 Historical marker for Benjamin Hawkins
 Benjamin Hawkins historical marker in Franklin, Georgia
 
 
 

1754 births
1818 deaths
People from Warren County, North Carolina
People of colonial North Carolina
American people of English descent
Continental Congressmen from North Carolina
Pro-Administration Party United States senators from North Carolina
Anti-Administration Party United States senators from North Carolina
United States Indian agents
Cherokee Nation (1794–1907)
People from Crawford County, Georgia
American slave owners
Choctaw
Muscogee
Chickasaw
Members of the North Carolina House of Representatives
Princeton University alumni
Members of the American Antiquarian Society
Continental Army staff officers
People of the Creek War
United States senators who owned slaves